Sisid (International title: Pearl Diver / ) is a 2011 Philippine television drama series broadcast by GMA Network. Directed by Ricky Davao, it stars Jackie Rice. It premiered on May 30, 2011 on the network's Dramarama sa Hapon line up replacing My Lover, My Wife. The series concluded on September 16, 2011 with a total of 79 episodes. It was replaced by Kung Aagawin Mo ang Langit in its timeslot.

Production
Sisid was first launched as part of GMA Network's "nationwide dominance" plug and was originally set to replace Koreana starting 28 February. It was postponed because Jackie Rice, who plays the main character, did not know how to swim (as required by the show); she took swimming training and lessons before taping any episodes. My Lover, My Wife suddenly took out the time slot that was originally meant for Sisid.

Cast and characters

Lead cast
 Jackie Rice as Eden Cordelia / Pearl dela Vida

Supporting cast
 Dominic Roco as Sigfried Zaragoza
 JC Tiuseco as Ahmed
 Marco Alcaraz as Chad
 Rich Asuncion as Frida
 Bela Padilla as Monique
 Ian Batherson as Dexter
 Ynna Asistio as Gina
 Marc Acueza as Samuel Zaragoza
 Angelu de Leon as Alicia Cordelia
 Daniel Fernando as Hamil Cordelia
 Alicia Mayer as Alona Zaragoza
 Bembol Roco as Segismundo Zaragoza
 Maricar de Mesa as Perla
 Patricia Ysmael as Lovely
 Leo Martinez as Ramon dela Vida / Leo Sision
 Chanda Romero as L
 Lorenzo Mara as Akhim
 Bodjie Pascua as Ikong
 Mailes Kanapi as Mela
 Orlando Sol as Osama
 Ozu Ong as Toto
 Maria Rosario as Lira

Guest cast
 Cris Catagenas as a fisherman
 Mash Mojica as a fisherman
 Jeffrey Luna as a fisherman
 Enrico Reyes as a fisherman
 Romeo Edgar Abaygar as Nato
 Annie Revilla as a village woman
 Chie Nicdao-Alvear as a village woman

Ratings
According to AGB Nielsen Philippines' Mega Manila household television ratings, the pilot episode of Sisid earned a 17.9% rating.
While the final episode scored an 18.5% rating.

References

External links
 

2011 Philippine television series debuts
2011 Philippine television series endings
Filipino-language television shows
GMA Network drama series
Television shows set in the Philippines